Carmel Convent School is a group of Catholic schools in India. It has branches in Delhi, Giridih, Gorakhpur, Bhopal, Bangalore, Rourkela, Khopoli, Faridabad, Jorhat, Chandigarh, Gwalior, Kolkata, Durgapur, Madhupur, Dhanbad, Mancherial, Lucknow, Ujjain, Ahmedabad, Junagadh and the Andaman and Nicobar Islands.

History 
The Carmel Convent School was founded on July 16, 1957, by Mother Theodosia and five other sisters. It had no facilities and was dependent on donations. The first student, Iona D’Souza, was admitted on July 1, 1957, and she was followed by 59 others. On July 16, during the Feast of the Lady of Mount Carmel, the school was formally inaugurated.

In December 1957, there were 150 students enrolled, and by January 1985 enrollment had reached 350 students. Lower classes were added the following year. To accommodate this surge in students, the school rented a larger house.

Giridih

Carmel School Giridih is located in Jharkhand, India. It was established in 1954 and is affiliated with the Indian Certificate of Secondary Education Board, New Delhi.

Bhopal
Bhopal's Carmel Convent School was established by Mother Theodosia and her five sisters of Carmel in 1968. It is directed by the Congregation of Sisters of the Apostolic Carmel. The school is affiliated with the Central Board of Secondary Education, New Delhi and managed by the Carmel Convent Education Society.

Gwalior
The Carmel Convent Senior Secondary School, Gwalior, was founded in 1957 and is managed by the Teresian Carmel Education Society. The all-girls school offers classes from LKG to XII and is affiliated with the CBSE (Central Board of Secondary Education) board, New Delhi.

See also

 Carmel Convent School, Gwalior
 Carmel Convent School,Kolkata
Carmel School, Madhupur
 Carmel School, Rourkela
 Mount Carmel Convent Anglo-Indian Girls High School, Tangasseri, Kollam, Kerala.

References

External links
 School website
 Carmel School, Gorakhpur
 Carmel Girls' Inter College, Civil Lines, Gorakhpur
 Carmel Convent School, Junagadh (Gujarat)

Private schools in Madhya Pradesh
Private schools in Jharkhand
Private schools in Delhi
Private schools in Chandigarh
Christian schools in Chandigarh